Beau Vallon Heat is a basketball club based in Beau Vallon, the Seychelles. The team plays in the Seychelles Basketball League (SBL).

In 2020, the Heat made its debut in the first year of qualifying rounds of the Basketball Africa League (BAL).

Honours 
Seychelles Basketball League

 Champions: 2016, 2018

SBF Cup

 Winners: 2017

Seychelles End-of-the-Year Tournament

 Winners: 2020

In African competitions
BAL Qualifiers (1 appearance)
2020 – First Round

References

Basketball teams in Seychelles
Road to BAL teams